Ridgeway is a village in Iowa County, Wisconsin, United States. The population was 624 at the 2020 census. The village is adjacent to the Town of Ridgeway. It is part of the Madison Metropolitan Statistical Area.

Geography
Ridgeway is located at  (42.99915, -89.992326).

Demographics

2010 census
As of the census of 2010, there were 653 people, 267 households, and 164 families living in the village. The racial makeup of the village was 98.8% White, 0.9% from other races, and 0.3% from two or more races. Hispanic or Latino of any race were 5.1% of the population.

There were 267 households, of which 33.0% had children under the age of 18 living with them, 47.2% were married couples living together, 8.2% had a female householder with no husband present, 6.0% had a male householder with no wife present, and 38.6% were non-families. 29.6% of all households were made up of individuals, and 10.4% had someone living alone who was 65 years of age or older. The average household size was 2.41 and the average family size was 3.01.

The median age in the village was 35.8 years. 23.3% of residents were under the age of 18; 11.1% were between the ages of 18 and 24; 27.9% were from 25 to 44; 26.9% were from 45 to 64; and 10.7% were 65 years of age or older. The gender makeup of the village was 54.1% male and 45.9% female.

2000 census
As of the census of 2000, there were 689 people, 274 households, and 180 families living in the village. The population density was 545.0 people per square mile (211.1/km2). There were 286 housing units at an average density of 226.2 per square mile (87.6/km2). The racial makeup of the village was 98.26% White, 0.15% Native American, 1.31% Asian, and 0.29% from two or more races. 0.00% of the population were Hispanic or Latino of any race.

There were 274 households, out of which 33.9% had children under the age of 18 living with them, 50.7% were married couples living together, 10.9% had a female householder with no husband present, and 34.3% were non-families. 27.4% of all households were made up of individuals, and 9.5% had someone living alone who was 65 years of age or older. The average household size was 2.49 and the average family size was 3.04.

In the village, the population was spread out, with 26.1% under the age of 18, 8.1% from 18 to 24, 34.5% from 25 to 44, 20.9% from 45 to 64, and 10.3% who were 65 years of age or older. The median age was 36 years. For every 100 females, there were 101.5 males. For every 100 females age 18 and over, there were 99.6 males.

The median income for a household in the village was $41,548, and the median income for a family was $50,795. Males had a median income of $32,250 versus $22,308 for females. The per capita income for the village was $17,887. About 3.6% of families and 10.8% of the population were below the poverty line, including 15.1% of those under age 18 and 14.5% of those age 65 or over.

Notable residents
 Thomas Grant Cretney, Wisconsin State Representative
 Tom Davis, basketball coach, was born in Ridgeway.
 Evan Lewis, professional wrestler, first American Heavyweight Champion, member of the Professional Wrestling Hall of Fame and Museum and Wrestling Observer Newsletter Hall of Fame
 David Morris, Wisconsin State Representative
 Joel Whitman, Wisconsin State Senator

References

External links
 Official web site for the Village of Ridgeway

Villages in Wisconsin
Villages in Iowa County, Wisconsin
Madison, Wisconsin, metropolitan statistical area